Cristian Atanay Nápoles (born 27 November 1998, in Marianao) is a Cuban athlete specialising in the triple jump. He represented his country at the 2017 World Championships finishing fourth and only missing the bronze by four centimetres. Additionally, he won the silver medal at the 2016 World U20 Championships and the gold at the 2015 World Youth Championships. He competed at the 2020 Summer Olympics.

His personal best in the event is 17.38 metres (+0.8 m/s) set in Doha in 2019.

International competitions

References

1998 births
Living people
Cuban male triple jumpers
World Athletics Championships athletes for Cuba
Competitors at the 2018 Central American and Caribbean Games
Central American and Caribbean Games gold medalists for Cuba
Athletes from Havana
Central American and Caribbean Games medalists in athletics
Ibero-American Championships in Athletics winners
Athletes (track and field) at the 2020 Summer Olympics
Olympic athletes of Cuba
21st-century Cuban people